Eggshell membrane or shell membrane is the clear film lining eggshells, visible when one peels a boiled bird egg. Chicken eggshell membranes are used as a dietary supplement.

Eggshell membrane is derived commercially from the eggshells of industrial processors. In the United States, egg-breaking facilities generate more than 24 billion broken eggshells every year. There are various ways in which the membrane is separated from the shell, including chemical, mechanical, steam, and vacuum processes.

Composition 
Eggshell membrane is primarily composed of fibrous proteins such as collagen type I. Eggshell membranes also contain glycosaminoglycans, such as dermatan sulfate, chondroitin sulfate, and sulfated glycoproteins including hexosamines, such as glucosamine. Other components identified in eggshell membranes are hyaluronic acid, sialic acid, desmosine, isodesmosine, ovotransferrin, lysyl oxidase, lysozyme, and β-N-acetylglucosaminidase.

Uses 
Shell membrane is mainly used as a dietary supplement in a partially hydrolyzed powder form.

References

Eggs (food)
Dietary supplements